The Trojan Horse is a Canadian political drama two-part miniseries that first aired on CBC Television on 30 March 2008. It is a sequel to the 2004 miniseries, H2O. It stars Paul Gross, Greta Scacchi and Tom Skerritt. It was directed by Charles Binamé.

Plot
The story begins while a nationwide referendum is being held to decide whether or not Canada will join the United States. The people of Canada vote to join the U.S., while Prime Minister Tom McLaughlin (Paul Gross) watches the results on the news. Sitting at the house of former Prime Minister Marc Lavigne (Guy Nadon; from H2O), he plots revenge, stating that one day, he would tell Lavigne the fable of "The Mouse and the Frog".

Two years pass, at which point the film resumes. Canada has been split into six states (British Columbia, Alberta, Manitoba, Ontario, Quebec and Terra Nova), each with electoral votes, and representation in Congress. The story proceeds to focus on three major storylines: Tom McLaughlin attempting to reshape his political career and ascend to the presidency; reporter Helen Madigan (Greta Scacchi) uncovering elements of political intrigue as she follows leads into the murder of her estranged son; and U.S. President Stanfield (Tom Skerritt) using any means necessary to justify an invasion of Saudi Arabia in order to halt China's oil supply.

Cast

References

External links
 CBC Official site (archived)
 

2008 television films
2008 films
2000s Canadian television miniseries
English-language Canadian films
Canadian drama television films
CBC Television original films
Canada–United States relations in popular culture
Canadian political drama television series
Films directed by Charles Binamé
2000s Canadian films